PFC Ludogorets Razgrad is an association football club from Razgrad, Bulgaria. Since their introduction to the Bulgarian top-flight, Ludogorets have participated in five different seasons of the UEFA club competitions - four in the Champions League and two in the UEFA Europa League.

Ludogorets' first entry in the European competitions was in the 2012–13 Champions League against Dinamo Zagreb of Croatia. Since then, the club competes in Europe on an annual basis with variable success.

Ludogorets' best European performance came in  the 2013–14 Europa League, when the team won their group against PSV Eindhoven, Chornomorets Odessa and Dinamo Zagreb, eventually becoming the first Bulgarian team to win a UEFA Europa League group. Subsequently, they also reached the round of 16 stage of the same competition, after playing two memorable matches against Lazio, including a 1–0 away win and a 3–3 home draw, before being eliminated by Spanish club Valencia. Then, in the 2014–15 season, Ludogorets became the second Bulgarian team to reach the UEFA Champions League group stages (the first being Levski Sofia in 2006–07) after eliminating Steaua București 6–5 at penalties and the first one to score points in this phase following a 1–0 victory over FC Basel.

History 

After winning the 2011–12 A Group for the first time in their history, Ludogorets entered the second qualifying round of the UEFA Champions League for the 2012–13 season, where they lost 3–4 on aggregate by Croatian champions Dinamo Zagreb.

2013–14 Europa League round of 16 campaign

As 2012–13 Bulgarian champions, Ludogorets qualified for the 2013–14 Champions League qualifying rounds where they entered the tournament from the second preliminary round. Ludogorets were drawn against Slovan Bratislava. In the first leg in Bratislava, they recorded a 1–2 loss against the Slovak champions, keeping poor chances to advance. Despite this, Ludogorets obtained their first victory in the UEFA Champions League, after a 3–0 thrashing against Slovan at the Ludogorets Arena in the return match. As they advanced to the next round, they were drawn against Serbian champions, Partizan Belgrade. After two wins of 2–1 in Razgrad and 1–0 in the second leg, they managed to qualify for the play-off stage, obtaining indirectly their very first qualification to the group stages of a European competition. The team was drawn against FC Basel, but lost 2–4 at the Vasil Levski National Stadium in Sofia. After a second 0–2 loss in Switzerland, Ludogorets were eliminated and transferred to the Europa League for the very first time in their history.

Ludogorets were drawn in Group B of the 2013–14 Europa League, against PSV Eindhoven, Dinamo Zagreb and Chornomorets Odessa. At their debut in the competition, Ludogorets won 2–0 at Eindhoven over PSV, obtaining their first European group stages victory. On matchday 2, Ludogorets won 3–0 against Dinamo Zagreb, in a replay match from their previous Champions League season clash. On matchday 3, Ludogorets again won 1–0 against Chornomorets Odessa, becoming the first Bulgarian team to begin their group stage participation in European tournaments with three consecutive wins without conceding any goal. On matchday 4, they dropped the only points in a 1–1 home draw with Chornomorets Odesa. On matchday 5, Ludogorets win 2-1 at Zagreb against Dinamo. On the last matchday, Ludogorets again won 2–0 over PSV at Sofia and qualified for the round of 32 as group winners, with 16 points, being the only Bulgarian team undefeated in UEFA Europa League group stages. In the round of 32, Ludogorets were drawn against Italian cup holders, Lazio. In the first leg, held on Stadio Olimpico at Roma, Ludogorets won 1-0, with striker Roman Bezjak scoring the winning goal in a historic win. At Vasil Levski National Stadium, Ludogorets hold Lazio in a 3–3 draw, after Lazio had a 2–0 lead, until Bezjak and Hristo Zlatinski scored for 2–2. Later, Lazio scored for 3–2, but Juninho Quixada scored the equaliser for a 4–3 aggregate win,. In the round of 16, Ludogorets hosted Spanish team Valencia, but were defeated 0–3, suffering their first defeat in the UEFA Europa League. In the second leg at Mestalla Stadium, Ludogorets were again defeated 0–1 by Valencia and eliminated.

2014–15 Champions League group stages 

In the 2014–15 Champions League, Ludogorets again won both their qualifiers, against F91 Dudelange of Luxembourg and Partizan Belgrade. In the play-off they defeated Steaua București to reach the group stage for the first time. Goalkeeper Vladislav Stoyanov was dismissed for a second yellow card in the last minute of extra time in the second leg, when Ludogorets had used all their substitutes. In the penalty shoot-out, centre-back Cosmin Moți, having converted the first penalty, went in goal and made two saves to put Ludogorets through 6–5 on penalties. 

Ludogorets made their debut in the 2014–15 Champions League group phase on 16 September 2014, grabbing a 1-1 equalizer away against Liverpool in the 90th minute scored by Dani Abalo, but in an eventual 1-2 loss, as the newly signed goalkeeper Milan Borjan then gave away a penalty with a foul on Javi Manquillo, which Steven Gerrard converted to give Liverpool the victory. Ludogorets made their home debut in the 2014–15 Champions League group phase on 1 October 2014, scoring a goal in the 6th minute through Ludogorets' attacking midfielder Marcelinho against the current Champions League champion Real Madrid, but in an eventual 1–2 loss. In this game Cristiano Ronaldo took two penalties, with the first saved by the Ludogorets' goalkeeper Vladislav Stoyanov and the second converted into the goal for a 1-1 equalizer. On 22 October 2014, Yordan Minev scored his first goal for Ludogorets, scoring a last-minute winning goal in a 1–0 home win over Basel in the group stage of the Champions League. However, on matchday 4, Ludogorets were defeated 0-4 by Basel at St. Jakob-Park, suffering their worst defeat in the European competitions. On 26 November 2014, Dani Abalo scored in the 3rd minute and Georgi Terziev scored his first goal in the 88th minute, getting a 2–2 equalizer against Liverpool, in an eventual 2-2 draw. On the last matchday, Ludogorets were beaten 0-4 at Santiago Bernabéu by Real Madrid, ending their UEFA Champions League adventure on the fourth place, with 4 points, becoming the first Bulgarian team to record points in that competition when they defeated Basel. This was also the first home win for a Bulgarian team in the UEFA Champions League, and was followed by a 2-2 home draw with Liverpool.

Total statistics

Statistics by country

Match results 

Notes
 1Q: First qualifying round
 2Q: Second qualifying round
 3Q: Third qualifying round
 PO: Play-off round

Achievements and records 
 Biggest European home win: Ludogorets 7–0  Crusaders (11 July 2018, UEFA Champions league qualifying round first leg)
 Biggest European away win:  The New Saints 0–4 Ludogorets (15 August 2019, UEFA Europa League Third qualifying round second leg)
 Biggest European home defeat: Ludogorets 0–3  Valencia (13 March 2014, UEFA Europa League Round of 16)
 Biggest European away defeat:  Arsenal 6–0 Ludogorets (19 October 2016, UEFA Champions League group stage); Espanyol 6–0 Ludogorets (7 November 2019, UEFA Europa League group stage)
 Ludogorets became the first Bulgarian team to begin their group stage participation in European tournaments with 3 consecutive wins, when in the 2013–14 UEFA Europa League group stage they recorded consecutive wins against PSV Eindhoven (2–0), Dinamo Zagreb (3–0) and Chornomorets Odesa (1–0), without conceding a goal in any of the games.
 After the end of the Round of 32 in the 2013–14 UEFA Europa League, Ludogorets became the first Bulgarian team to record 9 wins in European competitions in a single season, as well as the first Bulgarian team to record 5 away wins in European competitions in a single season.
 During the 2014-15 UEFA Champions League, Ludogorets became the second Bulgarian team to reach the group stages of the competition, the first being Levski Sofia in 2006–07.
 During the 2014–15 UEFA Champions League group stage, Ludogorets became the first Bulgarian team to record points in that competition when they defeated Basel 1–0 at home. This was also the first home win for a Bulgarian team in the UEFA Champions League, and was followed by a 2–2 home draw with Liverpool. 
 Ludogorets became the first Bulgarian team to qualify twice for the Champions League group stage, achieving the feat during the 2016–17 season of the tournament. During that season, the team set a new record for most goals scored (6), and became the first Bulgarian team to avoid finishing last in their group.
 As of the 2017–18 season Ludogorets holds the record for most points scored in the UEFA Champions League group stage by a Bulgarian team with 4, most goals scored with 6, and fewest goals conceded with 14.

Goalscoring and appearance records

Players in bold are still playing for Ludogorets.
Players with 3 or more goals for Ludogorets in Europe are listed.
Includes appearances in UEFA Champions League and UEFA Europa League.

References 

PFC Ludogorets Razgrad
Ludogorets